The 7th Michigan Infantry Regiment was an infantry regiment that served in the Union Army during the American Civil War.

Service
The 7th Michigan Infantry was organized at Monroe, Michigan and  mustered into Federal service for a three-year enlistment on August 22, 1861. Among the ranks was future brigadier general Henry Baxter, who was captain of Company C.

The 7th was assigned to the Army of the Potomac soon after it was formed and served in the 3rd Brigade, 2nd Division, 2nd Corps, for the duration of the war. Sister regiments in the 3rd Brigade included the 19th Massachusetts, 20th Massachusetts, 42nd New York, and 59th New York.

Infantryman William Rufus Shafter was wounded at the Battle of Fair Oaks; he later received the Medal of Honor for heroism during the battle.

Sergeant Alonzo Smith of Company C received the Medal of Honor on December 1, 1864 for his actions at the Battle of Boydton Plank Road on October 27, 1864.

The 7th was one of the first regiments to cross the Rappahannock River on Dec. 11th, 1862 while under fire from Confederate sharpshooters hidden in the buildings of Fredericksburg, the first opposed riverine assault in American military history.

In July 1862, Norman J. Hall, a Regular Army artilleryman assumed command of the regiment and led it until he was promoted to brigade command before the Battle of Gettysburg.

The regiment was mustered out on July 5, 1865.

Total strength and casualties
The regiment suffered 11 officers and 197 enlisted men who were killed in action or mortally wounded and 3 officers and 186 enlisted men who died of disease, for a total of 397 
fatalities.

Commanders

Major Sylvanus W. Curtiss
Colonel Norman J. Hall
Lt Colonel Amos Steele
Lt Colonel George W. LaPoint

See also
List of Michigan Civil War Units
Michigan in the American Civil War

Notes

References
The Civil War Archive

Units and formations of the Union Army from Michigan
1865 disestablishments in Michigan
1861 establishments in Michigan
Military units and formations established in 1861
Military units and formations disestablished in 1865